"Duality" is a song by American heavy metal band Slipknot, released in 2004 as the first single from the band's third studio album Vol. 3: (The Subliminal Verses). A music video was made for the song, the music video is listed as Roadrunner Records' greatest video of all-time.

Musical structure
The album version of "Duality" is four minutes and twelve seconds long, and the radio edited version is three minutes and thirty-three seconds long. The song opens with lead vocalist Corey Taylor softly saying "I push my fingers into my...", leading up to lead guitarist Mick Thomson playing a riff accompanied by Craig Jones' keyboards while Taylor finishes the sentence with "...eyes", in a much more intense voice. The song is played in Drop B tuning (to which most of Slipknot's songs are tuned) and features a nu metal style.

Unlike many previous Slipknot singles, "Duality", like most of the songs on Vol. 3, does not have profanity. Thomson explained in a 2008 interview that vocalist Taylor was relying on explicit content in the lyrics, and wanted to try something "different". This was echoed by Jim Root in a 2011 interview. AllMusic said that "Duality"'s lyrics "aren't unique" to Slipknot but described it as "otherwise strong". Stylus Magazine said "Duality" had a "grindcore riff". Q wrote that the song "blow[s] the competition away".

Release and reception
"Duality" was originally released as a CD single on May 4, 2004.

On May 25, 2004, the single was released on 7-inch red vinyl to coincide with the release of the album. There is also a 7-inch picture disc release which includes the same track listing.

"Duality" reached band records of number five and six in the Hot Mainstream Rock Tracks and Hot Modern Rock Tracks charts (although on the former chart, the record has since been broken by "Dead Memories" and eventually "Snuff"). In the UK Singles Chart, the song reached number 15. The song also charted on the Bubbling Under Hot 100 chart at number six (their second highest-charting song on the chart, behind "Psychosocial"). To promote the single, the band also made an appearance on The Tonight Show with Jay Leno.

The song is included in the video games Madden NFL 10, the introduction theme in the 2004 PlayStation 2 game ATV Offroad Fury 3, as a downloadable content for the Rock Band series that was released on December 8, 2009 and the debut trailer for Nail'd. It is also included in the game Guitar Hero Live.

Jack Osbourne ranked the song number two on his list of "101 Adrenaline Rock Songs", with "Smells Like Teen Spirit" by Nirvana beating it to the number one spot.

In the 2004 Metal Edge Readers' Choice Awards, the song was voted "Song of the Year" and "Music Video of the Year".

In 2020, Kerrang and Louder Sound ranked the song number five and number three, respectively, on their lists of the greatest Slipknot songs.

Music video
The music video, directed by Mark Klasfeld and Tony Petrossian, cost between $300,000 and $500,000 and was recorded on March 27, 2004. It was shot in Des Moines, Iowa, at a fan's house that was due for renovation, and features the band performing inside the house surrounded by dozens of fans both inside and outside the house, which gets destroyed in the process as the fans crash through the windows and walls. In the aftermath, the family asked the band to replace an extensive list of objects and fittings that were damaged or destroyed during the shoot. Roadrunner Records provided the family with roughly $50,000 as compensation. Prior to filming, the production told the crowd only to act wild but not destroy the house; this rule was left unheeded. Midway through the shooting, the band and fans were asked to avoid jumping around too much, as it would have resulted in either the floor caving in or the entire house collapsing. Fans were also told to take extreme caution around Craig Jones as the nails in his mask may injure them. It was revealed later that the band had performed the song several times while the crowd vandalized the house, and the resulting footage was edited to produce the video.

Shawn Crahan recalls that the band "asked our real fans to be in the video and people came from all over", adding that "it meant so much to us. We weren't really supposed to destroy that house – but we did it anyway. Another plus for that song is that I get to beat the fuck out of my keg. What else could you want?" One of the fans was a teenage British national who used some of his savings and his grandmother's money to travel to Iowa from England for the shoot and was accommodated by Corey Taylor after being denied a check-in at a local hotel due to his age. Two incidents occurred during the filming; two fans were injured by broken glass but were treated on the scene by paramedics stationed during filming and a doctor who lived in the neighborhood where the shoot occurred, while a group of youths were arrested by police present during filming for using baseball bats to vandalize a Ford Taurus rented by the band's record label to bring fans to the shoot's location.

As of March 2023, the music video for "Duality" has over 360 million views on YouTube.

The music video is also available on the CD single and the DVD Voliminal: Inside the Nine, released in 2006.

Charts

Certifications

Track listings
All songs written by Slipknot.

CD single

 include music video "Duality" on some versions

7" vinyl / EU cardboard sleeve CD single

US promo CD

EU promo CD

Release history

Cover versions
In 2014, as part of their album, Just The Tip..., comedy rock lounge act The Lounge Kittens covered the song.

In 2016, the British rock band Asking Alexandria covered the song for the compilation album Decades of Destruction.

In 2018, the German rapper Alligatoah covered the song for the cover album Fremde Zungen.

References

2004 singles
2004 songs
Slipknot (band) songs
Roadrunner Records singles
Music videos directed by Tony Petrossian
Song recordings produced by Rick Rubin
Songs written by Paul Gray (American musician)
Songs written by Corey Taylor
Songs written by Jim Root
Songs written by Joey Jordison
American hard rock songs